Lori Sippel (born 16 May 1965) is a Canadian softball player. She competed in the women's tournament at the 1996 Summer Olympics, and coached the team at the 2008 Summer Olympics.

References

External links
 

1965 births
Living people
Canadian softball players
Olympic softball players of Canada
Softball players at the 1996 Summer Olympics
Sportspeople from Stratford, Ontario